The Zotye SR7 was a compact crossover SUV produced by Zotye Auto for the Chinese market.

Overview
The production car debuted on the 2015 Guangzhou Auto Show.  It was officially launched on the Chinese car market in late December 2015, pricing starts around 66,800 yuan. The SR7 is a controversial vehicle in terms of styling, because it moderately resembles the Audi Q3. The Zotye SR7 is the first product of the Zotye S-series crossovers. According to Zotye, "SR" stands for “Sixth Revolutions”.

References

Notes

External links

 众泰汽车

Cars of China
SR7
Crossover sport utility vehicles
Compact sport utility vehicles
Front-wheel-drive vehicles
Cars introduced in 2015
2010s cars